Blood at Sundown is a Spaghetti Western film directed by Alberto Cardone.  The picture marks the first appearance of the character Sartana, played by Gianni Garko.  It is not, however considered an "official" Sartana film.

Plot
Johnny Liston heads back to his hometown after 12 years in jail, during which time his ruthless brother Sartana (Garko) has taken over control of the town.  Johnny is determined to battle Sartana to bring justice.

Cast
Anthony Steffen as Johnny Liston 
Gianni Garko as Sartana Liston (as John Garko)
Erika Blanc as Joselita Rogers
Carlo D'Angelo as Judge Waldorf (as Charles of Angel) 
Sieghardt Rupp as Ralph 
Roberto Miali as Jerry Holt (as Jerry Wilson) 
Carla Calò as Rhonda Liston (as Carrol Brown) 
Angelica Ott as Mary 
Daniela Igliozzi  as Manuela Holt  
Franco Fantasia as Sheriff 
Gianni Solaro as Forrester 
Chris Howland as Doodle Kramer 
Gino Marturano as Man in bar 
Sal Borgese as Mexican in bar 
Ettore Arena   
Mario Dionisi

Releases
Blood at Sundown was released in Italy as 1000 dollari sul nero on 18 December 1966.

References

External links
 
Spaghetti Western database

1966 films
West German films
1960s Italian-language films
1966 Western (genre) films
Spaghetti Western films
Films directed by Alberto Cardone
Films shot in Almería
Films with screenplays by Ernesto Gastaldi
1960s Italian films